MGM Channel was a global-based television network that was launched in 1999 by Metro-Goldwyn-Mayer Studios that aired movies from MGM's library, including West Side Story, Midnight Cowboy, The Terminator, Moonraker, The Manchurian Candidate, The Black Stallion, Blown Away, amongst many others. The network had access to the Metro-Goldwyn-Mayer library of films, comprising approximately 4,000 titles, and over 10,400 episodes of television programming.

Following AMC Networks' acquisition of Chellomedia, it was announced on 4 August 2014 that MGM Channel would be rebranded as AMC in late 2014. On 5 November 2014, MGM became a Hungarian Version of AMC.

As of 2015, MGM Channel has been indirectly found out to have continued airing in Ireland, Austria, Switzerland, Germany, Iceland and some other countries.

On 1 January 2015, the Asian version of AMC was launched, replacing MGM in Asia and also in Sri Lanka for the first time it received AMC.

MGM HD
MGM HD was a high definition version of the channel.

See also
MGM Networks
MGM HD

References

External links

Television channels and stations established in 1999